The first season of Shameless, an American comedy-drama television series based on the British series of the same name by Paul Abbott, premiered on January 9, 2011, at Sunday 10:00 p.m. EST on the Showtime television network. Executive producers are John Wells, Paul Abbott and Andrew Stearn, with producer Michael Hissrich. The season concluded after 12 episodes on March 27, 2011. The show's season premiere was watched by 982,000 viewers, making it the network's biggest turnout for a series premiere since Dead Like Me in 2003. The episode airing January 30, "Casey Casden", received 1.45 million total viewers, making Shameless the best performing first-year drama on Showtime. The season finale scored 1.16 million viewers.

Plot
The first season of Shameless depicts the dysfunctional family of Frank Gallagher, a single, alcoholic, and trashy father of six children in Chicago, Illinois. With Frank's bipolar wife, Monica, running away from Frank prior to the first season, the family has been run by Frank's eldest daughter Fiona, who raises her five other siblings: the extraordinarily intelligent Lip, goofy and strong-hearted Ian, the mature and grounded Debbie, the troublemaking and unruly child Carl, and Liam, who is mysteriously black (in the second half of the season, a paternity test reveals Frank as Liam's biological father). Often involved in the Gallagher's lives are their neighbors, Kevin and Veronica, who fake a marriage mid-season to obtain a substantial dowry.

The season's core story revolves around Steve Wilton, an affluent man whom Fiona and Veronica meet at a dance club. Fiona begins a relationship with Steve and discovers that he is a high end car thief. Fiona's childhood friend and police officer, Tony Markovich, expresses interest in dating Fiona, though Fiona ultimately turns him down. When Steve leaves town to visit his family in Lake Forest, it is revealed that his real name is Jimmy Lishman; Jimmy, under the alias of Steve, comes from a wealthy family who presumes he is away at medical school. When Debbie discovers Steve's secret, she agrees to keep it a secret from Fiona, but does notify Steve's real mother about his double life.

The subsidiary plot throughout the season involves Ian, who is a closeted homosexual, his sexual orientation only known to Lip and a friend, Mandy. Ian pursues a sexual relationship with his boss Kash, the adult owner of a local convenience store. Kash is unhappily married to his wife, Linda, who discovers the affair through the store's newly installed security cameras; Linda blackmails Kash into impregnating her. Mandy's thug brother, Mickey Milkovich, openly shoplifts from the store and regularly insults Kash. When Ian confronts Mickey, the two unexpectedly have sex, and they begin a casual sexual relationship. When Kash finds out, he angrily shoots Mickey in the leg when he attempts to shoplift. Mickey is arrested for attempted shoplifting and Kash is praised for his efforts. In the final episode, Ian comes out to Fiona, who is accepting of his sexuality.

Frank's eldest son, Lip, is in an open relationship with the promiscuous Karen Jackson, though Lip wants to pursue their relationship as more than a casual fling. Karen's mother, Sheila, is a nice but kooky housewife diagnosed with severe agoraphobia. Frank becomes romantic with Sheila and moves in with her, though he's mainly there to freeload and cash on Sheila's disability checks, much to Karen's dismay. Sheila's estranged ex-husband, Eddie, attempts to reconcile with Karen by inviting her to a purity ball, a father/daughter event where girls pledge their chastity. When Karen delves into a detailed list of her sexual history at the ball, as required by the ball's program, Eddie angrily calls her a whore. Sheila furiously kicks Eddie out of her house, overcoming her agoraphobia in the process. In a cruder turn of events, Karen wants to get revenge on her father and rapes an incapacitated Frank, showcasing the incident on a video blog that she sends to Eddie and his co-workers. Beaten over the video and past events, Eddie commits suicide by jumping in a frozen lake. Consequently, a guilt-stricken Karen breaks up with Lip. Both Frank and Karen separately apologize to Lip for the video.

In the final episodes, Lip and Ian are arrested after being caught driving one of Steve's stolen cars, straining Fiona and Steve's relationship; though Fiona, conflicted, admits that she may be falling in love with Steve. Meanwhile, Tony discovers the truth about Steve's occupation. He attacks Steve and gives him an ultimatum—to turn himself in and be arrested, or to leave Fiona and disappear without a trace. Though Steve tries to convince Fiona to accompany him in Costa Rica, Fiona declines his offer and takes up an office job from a new friend, Jasmine, to further care for her family. Under obligation, Steve is forced to run off without the girl he expected he'd be with.

Cast and characters

Main
 William H. Macy as Frank Gallagher
 Emmy Rossum as Fiona Gallagher
 Justin Chatwin as Steve Wilton / Jimmy Lishman
 Ethan Cutkosky as Carl Gallagher
 Shanola Hampton as Veronica "V" Fisher
 Steve Howey as Kevin "Kev" Ball
 Emma Kenney as Debbie Gallagher
 Cameron Monaghan as Ian Gallagher
 Jeremy Allen White as Phillip "Lip" Gallagher
 Laura Slade Wiggins as Karen Jackson
Joan Cusack as Sheila Jackson (credited as "special guest star" in opening title sequence)

Recurring
 Tyler Jacob Moore as Tony Markovich
 Joel Murray as Eddie Jackson
 Pej Vahdat as Kash
 Marguerite Moreau as Linda
 Jane Levy as Amanda "Mandy" Milkovich
 Noel Fisher as Mikhailo Aleksandr "Mickey" Milkovich
 Vanessa Bell Calloway as Carol Fisher
 Jim Hoffmaster as Kermit
 Michael Patrick McGill as Tommy
 Amy Smart as Jasmine Hollander
 Chloe Webb as Monica Gallagher
 Carlease Burke as Roberta
 Madison Davenport as Ethel

Episodes

Development and casting
HBO began developing an American version of Shameless after striking a deal with John Wells in January 2009. In October 2009, the project had been moved to Showtime, and it was reported that William H. Macy would star in the lead role as Frank Gallagher. Later that year, Dragonball Evolution co-stars Emmy Rossum and Justin Chatwin signed on as Fiona and Steve respectively; Allison Janney was also cast for the recurring role of Sheila. John Wells Productions filmed a pilot episode for the cable network in December 2009. Paul Abbott, whose semi-autobiographical telescript became the pilot episode for the original UK version, is credited as an executive producer on the U.S. version. In April 2010, Showtime green-lit the series with a twelve-episode order. In late August, it was announced that Janney would be leaving the show, due to her series commitment on the ABC comedy Mr. Sunshine; the role of Sheila was re-cast with Joan Cusack.

Production for the first season began mid-September, mainly being filmed in the North Lawndale community area of Chicago and Burbank, California at Warner Bros. Studios. A preview of the pilot aired on December 12, 2010, after the Season 5 finale of Dexter. The first season officially began airing on Showtime on Sunday, January 9, 2011.

Reception
Review aggregator Rotten Tomatoes gives the first season a 'Certified Fresh' rating of 70% based on 37 reviews, with the critical consensus "Shameless is a dark, urban dramedy that overcomes its leaps of faith thanks to fantastic casting, intriguing ambiance, and shock value."

DVD release

References

External links
 
 

2011 American television seasons
Shameless (American TV series)